Aritzia LP is a Canadian women's fashion brand founded in Vancouver, British Columbia, by Brian Hill in 1984. Aritzia sells a variety of lifestyle apparel through various upscale retail stores across Canada and the United States and online.

History 
Aritzia opened its first store in 1984 in Oakridge Centre, a Vancouver-area shopping mall.

The company went public on October 3, 2016.

In 2019, major shareholder Berkshire Partners, a private equity company, exited its stake.

In June 2021, Aritzia announced it would be acquiring Reigning Champ, a menswear-focused Canadian streetwear brand, for $63 million.

In May 2022, Jennifer Wong took over as CEO from Brian Hill.

Brands
Aritzia primarily sells in-house brands, such as Wilfred, Wilfred Free, Le Fou by Wilfred, TNA, Babaton, The Group by Babaton, 1 -01 Babaton, Sunday Best, Main Character, Community and Super Puff. In 2014, Aritzia introduced two handbag lines: SIXELEVEN and Auxiliary. Stores also carry clothing from labels such as Citizens of Humanity, Mackage, New Balance, Levi's, A Gold E, Havaianas, J Brand Jeans, Adidas, Herschel Supply Co. and Rag & Bone.

Stores
Aritzia's stores are designed individually. As of January 2021, Aritzia operates 101 stores in North America; 68 boutiques are located in Canada including 5 TNA stores, 8 Wilfred stores and 4 Babaton stores. There are 33 Aritzia stores in the USA, including a 13,000 square-foot flagship location in Manhattan, New York City.

In January 2017, Aritzia announced the opening of a flagship store in Chicago on Rush Street.

E-commerce
In November 2012, Aritzia launched the aritzia.com e-commerce site. It also provided a digital magazine with artist profiles and galleries of clothing trends.

Notes

 Clothing brands of Canada
 Clothing retailers of Canada
 Companies based in Vancouver
 Retail companies established in 1984
 Companies listed on the Toronto Stock Exchange
2016 initial public offerings
1984 establishments in British Columbia